Myrsine fusca is a species of plant in the family Primulaceae, endemic to French Polynesia.

References

fusca
Flora of French Polynesia
Least concern plants
Taxonomy articles created by Polbot